This is a list of flags used by and in Egypt. For more information about the national flag, visit the article Flag of Egypt.

National flag

Standards

Presidential standards
Throughout the republican era, the Standard of the President of Egypt has been identical to the national flag, with the addition of the coat of arms (eagle or hawk) in the upper-left corner. Even though the Constitution of Egypt states that the President is the Supreme Commander of the Armed Forces (article 150), the flag of the Supreme Commander differs from the Presidential Standard. It is identical to the national flag, with the addition in the upper-left corner of a white Eagle of Saladin contained between two crossed swords. The Supreme Commander also has his own naval ensign, air force flag and air defence flag. Military ordinances state that the flags of the Supreme Commander must be hoisted during the President's visits to each military unit. The national flag must be hoisted in the middle, with the Presidential Standard on its right side, and the flag of the Supreme Commander on its left side.

Royal standards

Military

Army

Navy

Air Force

Air Defense Forces

Government Department

Corporations

Governorates

Political flags

Historical flags

Other

Ancient Standards Present in Art

Proposed flags

References

Bibliography

External links

Flags
Flags of Egypt
Egypt